Redlight (sometimes misspelled Red Light) is a documentary film about human trafficking in Cambodia that premiered on October 4, 2009 at the Woodstock Film Festival. Lucy Liu was the film's executive producer and narrator. The film is produced by Kerry Girvin and directed by Guy Jacobson and Adi Ezroni. Redlight documents four years of the lives of several Cambodian children who are kidnapped for the purpose of child prostitution. These children are both boys and girls, and some are only 3 or 4 years old. Some of the film's footage was recorded secretly in brothels and then smuggled out. Liu promoted the film at the 2009 Cairo International Film Festival. Showtime televised the film as part of Human Trafficking Awareness Month in 2010. The first screening in Connecticut took place in Westport that November.

References

External links
 Redlight at IMDb

American documentary films
American crime films
Documentary films about organized crime
Films about pedophilia
Documentary films about child abuse
2000s crime films
2009 documentary films
Documentary films about slavery
Documentary films about prostitution
Works about sex trafficking
Forced prostitution
Films about child prostitution
Documentary films about poverty
2009 films
Khmer-language films
Human trafficking in Cambodia
Films about human trafficking
Films about prostitution in Cambodia
Documentary films about Cambodia
2000s English-language films
2000s American films